Miani is a Pushtun tribe that mainly inhabit the Gomal plains of Pakistan in the Tank District of Khyber Pakhtunkhwa, which was formerly North-West Frontier Province.

Historically Mianis have been migratory Powindah Tribes migrating between the Derajat Pakistan and Afghanistan though historical Gomal Pass. Many of them settled in the Gomal plains by 1850. There are also Miani people within the Dera Ismail Khan District of Pakistan who are related to the Mianis settled in the Gomal plains.

History
Mianis are believed to be a Shirani tribe that descended from the Sarbani. The Shiranis have three sub-tribes, namely Marani, Miani and Babar.

Maranis still refer to themselves as 'Shirani' as they are the main sub-tribe, but Babars and Mianis identify themselves as completely separate tribes.

A number of clans and sub clans of Miani tribe were Powindahs, who migrated between Afghanistan and Pakistan, afterwards large number of them settled in the Gomal Plains along with their other earlier settled tribesmen.

Gomal plains

Though initially a nomadic tribe, Mianis settled in the Gomal plains by or before 1850. The estimated population of nomadic Miani tribe was about 800 in the 1870s. They were a semi-independent group that lived along the Tank border, except for the hot season, when they moved into the hills. They were living among a small tribe, the Ghorezais (or Ghwarazai), of whom there were about 350 people. The larger tribe in the area was the Wazir, of whom there were a couple thousand people.

An important technique that the British used to manage the frontier was to make certain tribes responsible for monitoring who had passes to travel on particular routes into the hills. They called this “pass responsibility”. The Bhitannis first accepted pass responsibility on the Tank frontier. Then, pass responsibility for the Girni, Murtuza and Manjhi posts was assigned to the Miani and Ghurezai tribes in 1876. That year, they also accepted responsibility for monitoring passage into the Gomal Valley, as did a portion of the Ghwarazai that lived away from the other clan members of the Kakar tribe of Baluchistan.

In 1879, when Tank was raided by the Mehsuds and an uprising took place, wherein the tribes believed that the British control over the area is weakening, Mianis along with Suleman Khels and Kharotis looted a number of villages around Tank. The same fact has been narrated by  Evelyn Berkelen Howell, that in January 1879, Tank was raided by the Mahsud. Both Miani and Ghwarazai took part in the looting and plundering of Tank in the resulting disorder."

Miani in Baluchistan

Though a portion of Miani Tribe live in Baluchistan especially in the Shirani District, sizable population of the Miani people live in Sharigh Tehsil of Harnai District in Balochistan.  Luni and Jaffar tribes residing in Baluchistan too are believed to be descendants of Miani tribe.

References

Pashtun tribes
Pashto-language surnames
Pakistani names